The Hochwald is a mountain of the Swabian Jura near Gosheim in the German county of Tuttlingen. It is part of the Region of the 10 Thousanders. The summit, which is not open to the public, has a radar site belonging to the German Flight Safety organisation.

External links 

The thousand-metre mountains of the Swabian Jura

One-thousanders of Germany
Mountains and hills of Baden-Württemberg
Mountains and hills of the Swabian Jura
Tuttlingen (district)